Rashid Ashraf (born 13 August 1967) is an Indian former cricketer. He played two first-class matches for Hyderabad in 1990/91.

See also
 List of Hyderabad cricketers

References

External links
 

1967 births
Living people
Indian cricketers
Hyderabad cricketers
Place of birth missing (living people)